Bridgenorth is a locality and small rural community in the local government area of West Tamar, in the Western Tamar Valley region of Tasmania. A small part of the locality, about 4.5%, is in the Meander Valley Council area. The 2016 census determined a population of 373 for the state suburb of Bridgenorth.

History
The locality is believed to be named for Bridgnorth, a town in England. The name was assigned in 1999 and the boundary with Notley Hills was adjusted in 2006.

Road infrastructure
The C732 route (Bridgenorth Road) runs from the West Tamar Highway, passing through the locality from east to west and providing access to many other localities.

References

Localities of West Tamar Council
Towns in Tasmania